Éowyn (born Rebecca Éowyn Denee Krueger on March 1, 1979) is a Christian alternative rock artist from the Nashville, Tennessee, area who began performing in 1999.

Biography
Éowyn was born on March 1, 1979, in McCracken County, Kentucky. She is a Nashville-based recording artist with an industrial hard rock style and Gothic influences to back up her theatrical stage presence. She's had radio airplay in over 200 cities and has had two Top Twenty National Christian rock singles on the R&R charts. Her first single "Take Me Away" ranked at No. 18 and her second single "Hold Me" went to No. 15.

She has extensive touring experience playing in venues of all sizes, including festivals, bars, youth gatherings and arenas. She has shared the stage with some of the biggest artists in the Christian music industry including Krystal Meyers, Petra, Staple, Tait and others. She has toured throughout the U.S. from California to Florida.

Nashville's Embassy Music noticed her and awarded her Grand Prize winning songwriter for her song "Break Free". She also caught the attention of some of the top producers in the industry, including veterans Kevan Cyka (Lifehouse, R.E.M., Hilary Duff), Dan Needham (Stacie Orrico, Steven Curtis Chapman) and Matt Bronleewe (Plumb, Joy Williams).

In August 2006 Éowyn's guitarist Matt Hallmark was killed in a car crash driving home from Nashville after a concert tour. Her song "Unfinished Memories" on Silent Screams was written in his memory.

Due to financial difficulties, in 2008 she was forced to announce her departure from the industry and sell everything that had to do with her musical career.  In 2011, with what Éowyn describes as "only by God's grace," she is back.

Silent Screams (2008) and Beautiful Ashes (2011), were produced by Travis Wyrick (P.O.D., Disciple, Pillar) at Lakeside Studios. "Cliche" hit No. 17 on the Billboard Christian Rock Airplay chart in October 2012.

Origin of name
She says, "My name is actually from the Lord of the Rings books and now movies. My dad was a huge fan of Lord of the Rings, and Éowyn is one of the characters. People always ask me if it's my real name, but it really is."

Personal life
She is married to her manager and current keyboardist Russell Riggins.

Discography

Studio albums
 Shattered Illusions (2003) 
 Identity (2006) 
 Silent Screams (2008) 
 Beautiful Ashes (2011)
Just Believe (2018)

Singles
 "Take Me Away" (2004)
 "Hold Me" (2004)
 "Locked Away" (2006)
 "Escape" (2006)
 "Remedy" (2006)
 "Silent Screams" (2008)
 "Crashing" (2009)
 "Beautiful Ashes" (2011)
 "Fail Safe" (2011)
 "Cliché" (2012)
 "For the Life of Me" (2013)

References

External links

 

Performers of Christian rock music
1979 births
Living people
People from McCracken County, Kentucky
American alternative rock musicians
Rock musicians from Kentucky
Singers from Nashville, Tennessee
Singers from Kentucky
Kentucky women musicians
20th-century American singers
20th-century American women singers
21st-century American singers
21st-century American women singers